Santa Cruz (Spanish or Portuguese, 'holy cross') or Santacruz may refer to:

Places

Africa
Fort Santa Cruz, Oran, port city in Algeria
Santa Cruz, Cape Verde, municipality on the eastern part of the island of Santiago
Santa Cruz do Cabo de Gué, the 16th-century name of Agadir, Morocco
Santa Cruz (Santiago), a town on the island of Santiago, Cape Verde
Santa Cruz, São Tomé and Príncipe, on São Tomé Island

Asia and Oceania
Santa Cruz Islands, Solomon Islands in the Pacific Ocean

India
RAF Santacruz, former Royal Air Force airfield, Mumbai
Santacruz, Mumbai, Maharashtra
Santacruz Airport the domestic airport serving the Mumbai Metropolitan Area
Santacruz metro station, Mumbai
Santacruz railway station, railway station on the Mumbai suburban railway
Santa Cruz, Goa, suburb of the state capital of Panjim

Philippines

Santa Cruz, Camarines Norte (disambiguation)
Santa Cruz, a barangay in Jose Panganiban
Santa Cruz, a barangay in Labo
Santa Cruz, a barangay in Talisay
Santa Cruz, Davao del Sur, a municipality in Metropolitan Davao
Santa Cruz, Ilocos Sur, a municipality in the province of Ilocos Sur 
Santa Cruz, Laguna, a municipality and the capital of Laguna
Santa Cruz, Manila, a district in the north part of the city
Santa Cruz, Marinduque, a municipality in the province of Marinduque
Santa Cruz, Occidental Mindoro, a municipality in the province of Occidental Mindoro
Santa Cruz, Quezon City, a village in the San Francisco Del Monte district of Quezon City
Santa Cruz, San Jose, Camarines Sur, a barangay
Santa Cruz, San Jose, Dinagat Islands, a barangay
Santa Cruz, Tubajon, Dinagat Islands, a barangay
Santa Cruz, Zambales, a municipality in the province of Zambales 
Santa Cruz, barangay in the municipality of Cagayancillo, Palawan
Santa Cruz, barangay in Cebu City
Santa Cruz Poblacion, Calabanga, Camarines Sur, a barangay
Santa Cruz, barangay in the municipality of Anda, Bohol

Europe

Portugal
Santa Cruz (Almodôvar), civil parish in the municipality of Almodôvar
Santa Cruz (Coimbra), civil parish in the municipality of Coimbra
Santa Cruz, Madeira, municipality on the island of Madeira
Santa Cruz (Praia da Vitória), a civil parish on Terceira Island, Azores
, civil parish in Armamar
, former civil parish in Santiago do Cacém
Santa Cruz (Torres Vedras), village and beach resort in the parish of Silveira
, civil parish in the municipality of Vinhais

Azores
Santa Cruz (Lagoa), civil parish in the municipality of Lagoa
Santa Cruz das Flores, municipality on the island of Flores
Santa Cruz das Flores (parish), civil parish in the municipality of Santa Cruz das Flores
Santa Cruz da Graciosa, municipality on the island of Graciosa
Santa Cruz da Graciosa (parish), civil parish in the municipality of Santa Cruz da Graciosa

Spain

Municipalities

Santa Cruz de Bezana, municipality in Cantabria
Santa Cruz de Boedo, municipality in Palencia
Santa Cruz de Grío, municipality in Zaragoza
Santa Cruz de Moncayo, municipality in Zaragoza
Santa Cruz de Mudela, municipality in Ciudad Real
Santa Cruz de Nogueras, municipality in Teruel
Santa Cruz de la Salceda, municipality in Burgos
Santa Cruz de la Serós, municipality in Huesca
Santa Cruz de los Cáñamos, municipality in Ciudad Real
Santa Cruz de La Palma, municipality in the province of Santa Cruz de Tenerife in the Canary Islands

Other places in Spain
Province of Santa Cruz de Tenerife, containing the islands of Tenerife, La Gomera, El Hierro, and La Palma
Santa Cruz, an urban area in Oleiros, Galicia
Santa Cruz (Mieres), a parish in Mieres, Asturias
Santa Cruz, Seville, city district
Castillo de Santa Cruz, castle on the Isla de Santa Cruz in A Coruña, Galicia
Santa Cruz de Tenerife, capital of the Province of Santa Cruz de Tenerife and joint capital of the Canary Islands
Santa Cruz del Valle de los Caídos, basilica and monument in the Sierra de Guadarrama, near Madrid

North and Central America
Santa Cruz (canton), Costa Rica, in Guanacaste Province, Costa Rica
Santa Cruz del Quiché, city in Guatemala
Santa Cruz, Lempira, a municipality in the department of Lempira, Honduras
Santa Cruz de Yojoa, municipality in Honduras
Santa Cruz, Jamaica, town in St. Elizabeth Parish, Jamaica
Santa Cruz, Trinidad and Tobago, town in the Santa Cruz Valley, Trinidad and Tobago

Belize
Santa Cruz, Orange Walk, a municipality in Belize
Santa Cruz, Stann Creek, municipality
Santa Cruz, Toledo, village in Toledo District

Canada
Santa Cruz, Ontario, an underwater ghost town

Cuba
Santa Cruz del Norte, town and municipality in the Mayabeque Province
Santa Cruz del Sur, town and municipality in the Camagüey Province

Dominican Republic
Santa Cruz de Barahona, city in the Barahona Province
Santa Cruz de El Seibo, city in the El Seibo Province
Santa Cruz de Mao, municipality in the Valverde province

Dutch Caribbean
Santa Cruz, Aruba, town in central Aruba
Playa Santa Cruz, beach on the Caribbean island of Curaçao

Mexico

State of Oaxaca

Santa Cruz Acatepec, town and municipality
Santa Cruz Amilpas, town and municipality
Santa Cruz de Bravo, town and municipality
Santa Cruz Itundujia, town and municipality
Santa Cruz Mixtepec, town and municipality
Santa Cruz Nundaco, town and municipality
Santa Cruz Papalutla, town and municipality
Santa Cruz Tacache de Mina, town and municipality
Santa Cruz Tacahua, town and municipality
Santa Cruz Tayata, town and municipality
Santa Cruz Xitla, town and municipality
Santa Cruz Xoxocotlán, town and municipality
Santa Cruz Zenzontepec, town and municipality

Other Mexican states
Santa Cruz Atizapán, town and municipality in Mexico State
Santa Cruz de Juventino Rosas, city and municipality in Guanajuato
Santa Cruz Municipality, Sonora
Santa Cruz, Sonora, town in Santa Cruz Municipality

Nicaragua
Santa Cruz, Rivas, village on the island of Ometepe in Lake Nicaragua
Santa Cruz, Rio San Juan, village in El Castillo Municipality

Panama
Santa Cruz, Renacimiento, corregimiento in Renacimiento District, Chiriquí Province
Santa Cruz, San Félix, corregimiento in San Félix District, Chiriquí Province

Puerto Rico
 Santa Cruz, Carolina, Puerto Rico, a barrio

United States

Santa Cruz, Arizona, a census-designated place (CDP) in Pinal County
Santa Cruz, Pima County, Arizona, a populated place situated in Pima County
Santa Cruz County, Arizona
Santa Cruz River (Arizona), river in southern Arizona and northern Sonora, Mexico
Santa Cruz County, California
Santa Cruz, California, county seat and city in Santa Cruz County
Santa Cruz Island, Santa Barbara County, California
Santa Cruz (Mariposa County), the former name of Indian Gulch, California
Santa Cruz, New Mexico
Santa Cruz, Texas
Santa Cruz, Starr County, Texas, a census-designated place in Starr County
Santa Cruz, the Spanish name for Saint Croix, United States Virgin Islands

South America
Santa Cruz, Chile, city and commune in the O'Higgins Region
Santa Cruz, Aragua, city and part of the metropolitan area of Maracay, Venezuela

Argentina
Santa Cruz Province, Argentina, in Patagonia
Puerto Santa Cruz, town and municipality in Santa Cruz province
 Santa Cruz, Catamarca, village and municipality
Santa Cruz, La Rioja, village and municipality
Santa Cruz River (Argentina), in Santa Cruz province

Bolivia
Santa Cruz Department (Bolivia)
Santa Cruz de la Sierra, capital city of Santa Cruz Department

Brazil

Municipalities

Santa Cruz, Paraíba
Santa Cruz, Rio Grande do Norte
Santa Cruz do Arari, Pará
Santa Cruz Cabrália, Bahia
Santa Cruz da Conceição, São Paulo
Santa Cruz do Escalvado, Minas Gerais
Santa Cruz da Esperança, São Paulo
Santa Cruz de Goiás
Santa Cruz dos Milagres, Piauí
Santa Cruz de Minas, Minas Gerais
Santa Cruz das Palmeiras, São Paulo
Santa Cruz do Piauí, Piauí
Santa Cruz do Rio Pardo, São Paulo
Santa Cruz de Salinas, Minas Gerais
Santa Cruz da Vitória, Bahia

Cities
Santa Cruz, Pernambuco, city in the state of Pernambuco
Santa Cruz da Baixa Verde, city in the state of Pernambuco
Santa Cruz do Capibaribe, city in the state of Pernambuco
Santa Cruz do Sul, city in Rio Grande do Sul

Other places in Brazil
Santa Cruz, Rio de Janeiro, neighborhood in Rio de Janeiro
Santa Cruz (São Paulo Metro), metro station in the Vila Mariana district of São Paulo

Colombia
Santa Cruz de Mompox, town and municipality in the Bolívar Department
Santa Cruz del Islote, island in the Caribbean Sea, part of the Archipelago of San Bernardo
Santacruz, Nariño, town and municipality
La Comuna n.º 2 Santa Cruz, commune in the city of Medellín

Ecuador
Santa Cruz Canton, Ecuador, canton in the province of Galápagos
Santa Cruz Island (Galápagos), one of the Galápagos Islands

Peru

Santa Cruz (mountain), mountain in the Cordillera Blanca

Santa Cruz District, Alto Amazonas, district of Alto Amazonas Province
Santa Cruz District, Ancash, district of Huaylas Province
Santa Cruz de Andamarca District, district of Huaral Province
Santa Cruz de Chuca District, district of Santiago de Chuco Province
Santa Cruz de Cocachacra District, district of Huarochirí Province
Santa Cruz de Flores District, district of Cañete Province
Santa Cruz District, Palpa, district of Palpa Province
Santa Cruz District, Santa Cruz, district and capital of Santa Cruz Province
Santa Cruz de Toledo District, district of Contumazá Province
Santa Cruz, Satipo, Peru, a settlement founded by Franciscans in 1673
Santa Cruz Province, Peru, province in the Cajamarca Region

People
Santa Cruz (surname), list of notable people bearing this name

Business
Santa Cruz Beach Boardwalk, oceanfront amusement park, Santa Cruz, California
Santa Cruz Bicycles, American bicycle manufacturer
Santa Cruz Games, video game company
Santa Cruz Guitar Company, American manufacturer of acoustic guitars, Santa Cruz, California
Santa Cruz Operation, software company
 Santa Cruz Skateboards, American brand of skateboards manufactured by NHS, Inc.
Santa Cruz, sound card manufactured by Turtle Beach Systems

Military
Battle of Santa Cruz (disambiguation), list of notable battles bearing this name
Battle of the Santa Cruz Islands, late−October, 1942
Fort of Santa Cruz (Horta), fort in the Azores
Fort of Santa Cruz (Oran), fort in Algeria

Music
Santa Cruz (band), Finnish hard rock band
Santa Cruz, Indie band from Bristol UK
"Santa Cruz", 2002 single by Irish band The Thrills
"Santa Cruz (You're Not That Far)", 2002 single by Irish band The Thrills from the 2002 album So Much for the City

Sports

Football (soccer)

Brazil
Associação Atlética Santa Cruz, football club in Salinópolis
Futebol Clube Santa Cruz, football club in Santa Cruz do Sol
Santa Cruz Esporte Clube, football club in Barra do Bugres
Santa Cruz Futebol Clube, football club in Recife
Santa Cruz Futebol Clube (MG), football club in Belo Horizonte
Santa Cruz Futebol Clube (RJ), football club in Rio de Janeiro
Santa Cruz Futebol Clube (RN), football club in Natal
Santa Cruz Recreativo Esporte Clube, football club in Santa Rita
Sport Club Santa Cruz, football club in Santa Cruz, Rio Grande do Norte

Chile
Deportes Santa Cruz, football club in Santa Cruz

Bolivia
Real Santa Cruz, football club in Santa Cruz de la Sierra
Club Blooming Santa Cruz, football club in Santa Cruz de la Sierra

Other sports
Santa Cruz Syndicate, professional mountain bike racing team
Santa Cruz Warriors, basketball team
UC Santa Cruz Banana Slugs, sports teams of the University of California, Santa Cruz

Other uses
Santa Cruz (Martian crater)
Santa Cruz Cartel, Bolivian drug cartel
Santa Cruz II, cruise ship of Ecuador
Santa Cruz massacre, 1991 massacre in Timor-Leste (formerly Indonesia)
Hyundai Santa Cruz, pickup truck introduced in 2021

See also
Canal de Santa Cruz, a salt water channel in the state of Pernambuco that separates the island of Itamaracá from the South American continent
Cruz, a surname
Cruz (disambiguation)
Holy Cross (disambiguation) (English equivalent)
Sainte-Croix (disambiguation) (French equivalent)
Santa Croce (disambiguation) (Italian equivalent)
Santa Cruise, a cruise ship that was previously named MS Annie Johnson
Santa Cruz Canton (disambiguation)
Santa Cruz District (disambiguation)
Santa Cruz Formation (disambiguation)
Santa Cruz Mountains, California
Santa Cruz Province (disambiguation)
St Cross (disambiguation)
University of California, Santa Cruz, public research university